

The Hendy 302 was a British two-seat cabin monoplane designed by Basil B. Henderson and built by George Parnall & Company Limited at Yate in 1929. Only one aircraft was built registered G-AAVT.

The 302 was a low-wing cantilever monoplane with fixed tailskid landing gear, powered by a 105 hp (78 kW) Cirrus Hermes I engine. It was flown by Edgar Percival in the 1930 King's Cup Race. It was rebuilt in 1934 as the 302A with an inverted 130 hp Cirrus Hermes IV and a revised cabin. It averaged 133.5 mph in the 1934 Kings Cup Race. It was used as a testbed for the Cirrus Major II engine before being withdrawn from use in 1938.

Specifications (302A)

References

 A.J. Jackson, British Civil Aircraft since 1919 Volume 3, 1974, Putnam, London, Page 252
 The Illustrated Encyclopedia of Aircraft (Part Work 1982-1985), 1985, Orbis Publishing, Page 2155

1920s British civil utility aircraft
Low-wing aircraft
Aircraft first flown in 1929
Hendy Aircraft Company aircraft
Single-engined tractor aircraft